The 1940–41 Tercera División was the 7th season of the Tercera Division since its establishment.

League tables

Group A1

Group A2

Group A3

Group B1

Group B2

Group B3

Promotion playoff

Group A

Group B

Final Round

External links
RSSSF 
Futbolme 

Tercera División seasons
3
Spain